Hashem Sabbaghian (born 4 April 1937) is an Iranian politician, humanitarian, democracy activist and former parliament member. He was minister of interior in the interim government led by Prime Minister Mehdi Bazargan in 1979. Later, he became a member of parliament from 1980 to 1984.

Early life and education
Sabbaghian was born on 4 April 1937 in Tehran. His father, Taghi was a businessman. He completed his elementary education in Hafez School and secondary education in Marv High-School. He holds an engineering degree.

Career
Sabbaghian started his political career in high school. He was one of the supporters of former Prime Minister Mohammad Mosaddegh. He joined Anjoman-e Eslami in 1951 when party was created and following the 1953 coup against Mosaddegh, he became an opponent to Mohammad Reza Pahlavi's policies. He was elected to the board of directors of University of Tehran in 1967 and was vice chancellor of the university from 1970 to 1974. He was jailed four times before the Iranian Revolution.

Following the revolution in February 1979, he was appointed by Ruhollah Khomeini to reorganize the oil industry. On 12 June 1979, he was appointed as interior minister, replacing Ahmad Sayyed Javadi. During his tenure, he held the constitutional convention election. He was elected as a member of the parliament in the 1980 election from Tehran on the list of the Freedom Movement of Iran. He was the chairman of the parliament's urban and development commission. He resigned from cabinet post on 6 November 1979 along with Prime Minister Bazargan.

In the 1984 election, he ran for seat again, but withdrew his candidacy after two weeks due to political pressure from Islamic hardliners. His candidacy for the 1996 election was also rejected by the Council of Guardians.

Later years
Sabbaghian joined the Freedom Movement led by Ebrahim Yazdi and served as Yazdi's deputy. Both of them were arrested in Isfahan on 1 October 2010.

Personal life
Sabbaghian married in 1965 and has four daughters and one son. One of his daughters and his son are also members of the Freedom Movement of Iran .

References

External links
IPP SAYS MURDER OF FORUHARS IS A LASTING SHAME FOR ISLAMIC REPUBLIC

1937 births
Living people
Iranian engineers
Freedom Movement of Iran MPs
People of the Iranian Revolution
Government ministers of Iran
Deputies of Tehran, Rey, Shemiranat and Eslamshahr
Iranian activists
Prisoners and detainees of Iran
Iranian revolutionaries
Members of the 1st Islamic Consultative Assembly
Members of the Iranian Committee for the Defense of Freedom and Human Rights
Members of the Association for Defense of Freedom and the Sovereignty of the Iranian Nation
20th-century Iranian engineers
20th-century Iranian politicians